Each team's World Cup roster consisted of twenty skaters (forwards and defencemen) and three goaltenders. All eight participating teams submitted their initial roster of sixteen players on March 2, 2016. The remaining seven players for each nation were announced May 27.

Age and team as of July 1, 2016.

Group A

Canada 
Head coach: Mike Babcock

Duncan Keith, Jeff Carter, Jamie Benn, and Tyler Seguin were all originally selected, but could not participate due to injury. They were replaced by Jay Bouwmeester, Corey Perry, Logan Couture, and Ryan O'Reilly, respectively.

Czech Republic 
Head coach: Josef Jandac

David Krejčí, Tomáš Hertl, and Radko Gudas were originally selected, but could not participate, because of injury. They were replaced by Roman Červenka, Michal Birner, and Tomáš Kundrátek, respectively.

Team Europe

Head coach: Ralph Krueger

Frederik Andersen was originally selected, but could not participate, because of injury. He was replaced by Philipp Grubauer.

United States 
Head coach: John Tortorella

Ryan Callahan was originally selected, but could not participate, because of injury. He was replaced by Kyle Palmieri.

Group B

Finland 
Head coach: Lauri Marjamäki

Team North America

Head coach: Todd McLellan

Sean Monahan was originally selected, but could not participate due to a back strain. He was replaced by Trocheck as a result.

Russia 
Head coach: Oleg Znarok

Slava Voynov was originally selected but was not allowed to participate. He was ruled ineligible because of his indefinite suspension from the NHL during the 2014–15 season. He was replaced by Nikita Nesterov.

Sweden 
Head coach: Rikard Grönborg

Robin Lehner, Niklas Kronwall, Alexander Steen, and Henrik Zetterberg were originally selected, but could not participate, because of injury. They were replaced by Jhonas Enroth, Hampus Lindholm, Rickard Rakell, and Mikael Backlund, respectively. Later, when Rakell himself pulled out, he was replaced by Patrik Berglund. Henrik Zetterberg was originally selected captain, but was replaced by Henrik Sedin when Zetterberg pulled out of the tournament.

References

Rosters
World Cup of Hockey rosters